Con el Corazón en la Mano may refer to:

 Con el Corazón en la Mano (Aterciopelados album), 1993
 Con el Corazón en la Mano (Rojo album), 2007